Peter Clive Rodon (5 February 1945 – July 2000) was a Welsh professional footballer who played as a centre forward.

Career
Born in Swansea, after playing youth football with Swansea City, Rodon began his professional career with Bradford City, scoring 15 goals in 64 appearances in the Football League between 1964 and 1967. He later returned to Wales, playing with Merthyr Tydfil.

Later and personal life
Rodon's son Chris, and grandson Joe have also played football professionally. Another son, Keri, father of Joe, played basketball for Wales.

Rodon died in Swansea in July 2000.

References

1945 births
2000 deaths
Welsh footballers
Swansea City A.F.C. players
Bradford City A.F.C. players
Merthyr Tydfil F.C. players
English Football League players
Association football forwards